"Donkey Riding" is a traditional work song or sea shanty originally sung in Canada, Scotland and the Northeastern United States. It has also become popular as a children's song. The earliest written record of the song dates to 1857. The tune and words are an adaptation of "Highland Laddie". It is generally, but not universally, agreed that the "donkey" of the song title is a reference to the steam donkey, a kind of general-purpose steam engine. Stan Hugill, a sea-music historian, said that he had been informed that the song was also sung in the Gulf Ports as well as being popular at sea.

Recordings
Recordings of this song include:
The Black Family on their self-titled album
Fisherman's Friends on Proper Job
 Great Big Sea on the albums Play and Road Rage
Rick Jones, Julie Stevens and Jonathan Cohen on Songs from Play School
The Travellers on The Travellers Sing for Kids
Wade Hemsworth on Folk Songs of the Canadian North Woods

References

External links
 

American folk songs
British folk songs
Canadian folk songs
Sea shanties